Salem's Lot is a 1995 BBC Radio 4 dramatization of Stephen King's 1975 novel 'Salem's Lot written by Gregory Evans. It combines the psychological thriller and the classic horror genres, making references to Bram Stoker's 1897 novel Dracula at several points and sometimes replicating its storyline.

Plot summary
Ben Mears, a successful writer who grew up in the (fictional) town of Jerusalem's Lot, Maine (known to locals as "Salem's Lot" or "The Lot"), has returned home following the death of his wife.  Ben plans to write a book about the "Marsten House", an abandoned mansion that gave him nightmares after a traumatic (and possibly supernatural) childhood experience.  Once in town, he meets local high school teacher Matt Burke and strikes up a romantic relationship with Susan Norton, a young college graduate.

Mears discovers that the Marsten house has been bought by Mr. Straker and Mr. Barlow, a pair of businessmen who are also new to the town, although only Straker has been seen. Their arrival coincides with the disappearance of a young boy, Ralphie Glick, and the suspicious death of his brother Danny. It then becomes clear that Barlow is a vampire, and is taking over the town with Straker's help. Ben, Matt, Susan, and a few other residents of the Lot try to prevent the vampires from spreading. In the end, Ben and young Mark Petrie succeed in neutralizing Straker and destroy the master vampire Barlow, but, lucky to escape with their lives, are forced to leave the town to the newly created vampires.

Cast and crew
 Stuart Milligan as Ben Mears
 Teresa Gallagher as Susan Norton
 Danny Cannaba as Mark Petrie
 Doug Bradley as Kurt Barlow
 John Moffatt as Richard Straker
 Gavin Muir as Matt Burke
 Kerry Shale as Jimmy Cody
 Don Fellows as Parkins Gillespie
 Nigel Anthony as Father Callahan
 George Parsons as Nolly Gardner
 Lorelei King as June Petrie
 Vincent Marzello as Henry Petrie
 Music by Elizabeth Parker of the BBC Radiophonic Workshop
 Dramatised by Gregory Evans
 Directed by Adrian Bean

Differences between the novel and radio adaptation
Although the story's overall structure remains similar, several lines have been consolidated and/or simplified, in keeping with the much-shortened radio format (seven 30-minute broadcasts).

 Ralphie Glick's role is reduced (from both 1975 novel and 1979 TV-film)
 Dud Rogers and the junkyard see only cursory mention (much of the Barlow/Dud Rogers dialogue having been re-scripted into the Barlow/Larry Crockett death scene)
 Danny Glick's rise from the grave (and Mike Ryerson's death) are now explicitly enabled/supervised by Barlow, who mesmerizes Ryerson and calls Danny forth
 Father Callahan and Dr. Cody become quick/willing vampire-hunters, with virtually no complaint or skepticism
 Mark Petrie uses shards of broken glass (rather than contortionist rope-tricks) to free himself from Straker's knots
 The entire narrative is framed by Ben Mears' confession to a Mexican priest (who periodically interrupts the retelling with specific questions)

'Salem's Lot
British radio dramas
BBC Radio dramas
1995 radio dramas
Adaptations of works by Stephen King
Vampires in popular culture